Girls' Hostel is a 1962 Hindi drama film starring Ajit, Nalini Jaywant and Johnny Walker in lead and Geetanjali in character roles. The  music was composed by Ravi. The film was directed by Ravindra Dave and produced by B. R. Ishara.

Cast
Ajit
Nalini Jaywant
Johnny Walker
Geethanjali 
Cuckoo

Soundtrack

References

External links
 

Films scored by Ravi
1962 films
1960s Hindi-language films